Luís Gomes da Mata Coronel was a Portuguese nobleman and the 5th High-Courier of the Kingdom of Portugal.

See also 
Luís Gomes da Mata
Duarte de Sousa da Mata Coutinho
Correio-Mor Palace
Palace of the Counts of Penafiel

High-Courier of the Kingdom of Portugal
Portuguese nobility
Year of birth missing
Year of death missing